P L Lokhande Marg is a road in eastern Mumbai connecting Amar Mahal in Chembur to Deonar.

References

Streets in Mumbai

P L Lokhande marg is also a land mark of New Gautam nagar which is in GOVANDI